The Samsung SPH-M920 (marketed as the Samsung Transform) is an Android smartphone manufactured by Samsung. It was announced on October 6, 2010 and released on October 10, 2010 for Sprint in the United States.

The Samsung Transform was released using Android 2.1 (Eclair), but received an update to version 2.2.2 on March 25, 2011.

The Transform is one of the first devices to be equipped with Sprint's "Sprint ID" user interface. It's considered a mid-range smartphone and the successor to the Samsung Intercept with a few upgrades including faster data (EVDO Rev. A), a larger 3.5" inch touchscreen, and a VGA front-facing camera for video calling (expected to work with 2.2 update). The phone's form factor resembles that of the Samsung Epic 4G and is being offered as a 'budget minded' alternative.

Samsung Transform Ultra (SPH-M930) 
In September 2011, Sprint announced the Samsung Transform Ultra, an updated version to the original Transform that features a faster 1GHz processor and physical navigational keys, Sprint subsidiary Boost Mobile began offering the smartphone on October 7 and Sprint said it would carry it at a later date.

See also
List of Android devices
Android OS
Galaxy Nexus

References

Samsung Transform-Google Phone Gallery
Attractive Samsung Transform Boasts Sprint ID for the Ultimate in Personalization on an Android Phone
Samsung Transform fact sheet

External links
Samsung Transform Homepage
Samsung Transform User Group
Phone Scoop
Samsung Transform Photo with Attribution 2.0 Generic (CC BY 2.0) licensing

Mobile phones with an integrated hardware keyboard
Android (operating system) devices
Sprint Corporation
Mobile phones introduced in 2010
Discontinued smartphones